Magunima Tawali (born December 31, 1988, in Kpalimé) is a Togolese footballer, who plays for Gomido.

Career
Tawali began his career at the age from 16 with Diwa Start in Kpalimé. In 2005, he signed with the city rival Gomido. The club loaned him in January 2006 to Maranatha F.C. for one year, and he returned in July 2007.

References

External links
 

Togolese footballers
Togo international footballers
1988 births
Living people
Maranatha FC players
Gomido FC players
People from Kpalimé
Association football defenders
21st-century Togolese people